Jiří Lála (born August 21, 1959 in Tábor, Czechoslovakia) is a retired professional ice hockey player who played in the Czechoslovak Extraliga. He played for HC Jihlava. He was a member of the Czechoslovak 1981 Canada Cup team and was a silver medallist at the 1984 Winter Olympics. He was named the best forward at the 1983 World Championships and was the top scorer on the Czechoslovak team that won the world championship in 1985, with 13 points (8+5) in 10 games.

After 510 games and 297 goals in Czechoslovakia, he moved to West Germany in 1989.

He immediately became the top scorer for his home team Eintracht Frankfurt in the 1989/90 and 1990/91 seasons. After heavy mismanagement and near bankruptcy of Eintracht Frankfurt, he played for Mannheimer ERC for two seasons, until he returned to Frankfurt in the 1994/95 season to play in the newly formed Frankfurt Lions team.

He retired from the sport in 2006. Lála was inducted into the Czech Ice Hockey Hall of Fame on May 6, 2010.

Career statistics

Regular season and playoffs

International

External links

1959 births
Living people
Adler Mannheim players
Ayr Scottish Eagles players
Czech ice hockey right wingers
Czechoslovak ice hockey right wingers
EV Regensburg players
Frankfurt Lions players
GCK Lions players
HC Dukla Jihlava players
Motor České Budějovice players
Ice hockey players at the 1984 Winter Olympics
Ice hockey players at the 1988 Winter Olympics
Olympic ice hockey players of Czechoslovakia
Olympic silver medalists for Czechoslovakia
People from Tábor
Quebec Nordiques draft picks
SC Bern players
Olympic medalists in ice hockey
Medalists at the 1984 Winter Olympics
Sportspeople from the South Bohemian Region
Czech expatriate sportspeople in Scotland
Czech expatriate ice hockey players in Germany
Czech expatriate ice hockey players in Switzerland
Expatriate ice hockey players in Scotland
Czechoslovak expatriate sportspeople in West Germany
Czechoslovak expatriate ice hockey people
Expatriate ice hockey players in West Germany
Czechoslovak expatriate sportspeople in Germany